George Hsu is a Taiwanese politician. He has served as the Administrative Deputy Minister of Ministry of Culture (MOC) of the Republic of China since 20 May 2012.

Education
Hsu obtained his master's degree in political science from National Taiwan University.

MOC Administrative Deputy Minister

Taiwanese low reading habit
During a session at the Executive Yuan in March 2013 when MOC Minister Lung Ying-tai presented a report on the strategies to boost Taiwan's publishing industries to elevate Taiwanese low reading habit, Hsu said that the MOC will try to help local publishers to go into Mainland China market by asking Beijing to lower down the tariffs of Taiwanese books during ECFA negotiation.

References

Living people
21st-century Taiwanese politicians
1952 births
National Taiwan University alumni